Alturas is an unincorporated community and census-designated place in Polk County, Florida, United States. Its population was 4,084 as of the 2020 census. Alturas has a post office with ZIP code 33820.

The main road that runs through Alturas is Polk County Road 665A, although Florida State Road 60 runs just north of the community.

Demographics

References

Unincorporated communities in Polk County, Florida
Census-designated places in Florida
Unincorporated communities in Florida
Census-designated places in Polk County, Florida